The National Archives of Libya (Dar al-Mahfuzat al-Tarikhiyya) is the national archives of Libya, located in the Red Castle in Tripoli. As of 1980 it was overseen by Salaheddin Hasan al-Suri, Director of Antiquities.

See also 
 List of national archives
 Libyan Studies Center
 National Library of Libya
 Public Library of Libya
 Libyan Government Library
 Garyounis University Library

References

Bibliography
 
 
 
 
 

Libya
Libyan culture
Buildings and structures in Tripoli, Libya
History of Libya
Organizations based in Tripoli, Libya